Cecilia Ibru (born 22 March 1946) is the former managing director and chief executive officer of Oceanic Bank. Ibru began her work at the Ibru Organization. In 2009, she was arrested and pleaded guilty to charges of fraud. She was jailed and fined approximately one billion euros.

She lost her husband, Michael Ibru in September 2016.

Early life and education

Born to Edward and Victoria Sido Yes, Ibru attended Saint Margaret’s Grammar School in Ilesa from 1960 to 1965 along with her twin Lucy and studied at University Tutorial College in London from 1967 to 1968.

She graduated from the University of London in 1971 with a BS in sociology. Ibru pursued her graduate studies at the university and received a Masters of Philosophy from the School of Oriental and African Studies in 1977.

Career

In 1978, Ibru joined the Ibru Organization as project director. After two years in this role, Ibru went on to serve as international finance coordinator, a position she held until 1990.

Ibru began working with Oceanic Bank in 1990 as general manager. After seven years with Oceanic, she was promoted to managing director and CEO. Oceanic began as a small family-owned bank, but grew into one of the Nigeria’s largest publicly quoted institutions during Ibru’s stewardship.

On 13 August 2009 Ibru was amongst five bank CEOs who were dismissed. Five replacements were named by the Central Bank of Nigeria. The deputy governor, Sarah Alade, announced that John Aloh would replace Ibru at Oceanic. Others replaced on the same day included the CEO of the Union Bank of Nigeria, Dr. Bath Ebong, who was replaced by Olufunke Iyabo Osibodu.

Ibru appeared in court alongside three other senior banking executives in Nigeria. They all denied charges that they were involved in a multibillion-dollar banking scandal. She was sentenced on 8 October 2010 on 25 counts of fraud and ordered to reimburse 1.29bn (approximately one billion Euros, and she was ordered to serve six months of prison. Anti-corruption police brought criminal charges against executives from five banks rescued in a 400bn naira ($2.6bn; £1.6bn) government bail-out. All the banks were found to have low cash reserves because of bad loans. Ibru had extended credit facilities of 16 billion NAIRA to a company who had no collateral. The court confiscated over 100 properties from her in Nigeria, Dubai and the United States.

Michael and Cecilia Ibru Foundation
Ibru created the Michael and Cecilia Ibru Foundation in 2006, which donates money to support vocational training, elderly care, health programs, disease prevention, and food production..She founded the Michael and Cecilia Ibru University in 2015 in Agbarha otor Delta State

References 

Nigerian chief executives
Living people
1946 births
Alumni of SOAS University of London
Ibru family